"Roads" is the first single by British pop rock band Lawson from their self-titled EP. The song was released in the United Kingdom on 31 May 2015, via Polydor Records. It debuted and peaked at number 11 on the UK Singles Chart. It also became their first single to not chart in the Republic of Ireland.

Track listing
 Digital download
 "Roads" – 3:35

 Roads EP
 "Roads (acoustic)" – 3:59
 "Up in Flames" – 3:03
 "Roads (live)" – 4:05
 "Roads (Kat Krazy remix)" – 3:43

 Signed Roads CD single
 "Roads" – 3:35
 "Up in Flames" – 3:03
 "Roads (acoustic)" – 3:59
 "Roads (Kat Krazy remix)" – 3:43

Music video

A lyrics video for the song was released on 11 March 2015; another video, shot in Lofoten, Norway which features a 1969 Chevrolet Camaro was released on 31 March 2015.

Chart performance

Release history

References

2015 singles
2015 songs
Lawson (band) songs
Polydor Records singles
Songs written by Ki Fitzgerald
Music videos shot in Norway